V. Govindan (1940/1941 – 23 October 2021) was an Indian politician who served as Member of the Legislative Assembly of Tamil Nadu. He was elected to the Tamil Nadu legislative assembly from Pernambut constituency as a Dravida Munnetra Kazhagam candidate in the 1989 and 1996 elections. The constituency was reserved for candidates from the Scheduled Castes.

References 

1940s births
2021 deaths
Dravida Munnetra Kazhagam politicians
Tamil Nadu MLAs 1996–2001
People from Vellore district
Year of birth missing